Portia is a female protagonist of William Shakespeare's The Merchant of Venice. A rich, beautiful, intelligent heiress of Belmont, she is bound by the lottery set forth in her father's will, which gives potential suitors the chance to choose among three caskets. If he chooses the right casket, he wins Portia's hand in marriage. If he chooses the incorrect casket, he must leave and never woo any other woman in marriage. She is shown to think little of various foreign noblemen of similar rank who are most likely to seek her hand in marriage and still less of two suitors who seem to attempt her father's assigned task. Instead she favours a young but impoverished Venetian noble, Bassanio, who is also a soldier and a  scholar. Bassanio goes on to choose the right casket.

Portia is also fond of wordplay and proverbs, frequently quoting and coining them, which was considered a sign of wisdom and sharp wit in Elizabethan era. Some suggest that the character of Portia was based on Queen Elizabeth herself, who also had a penchant for proverbs.

Plot 

She is beautiful, gracious, rich, intelligent, and quick-witted, with a luxury lifestyle and high standards for her potential romantic partners. She is bound by the lottery set forth in her father's will, which gives potential suitors the chance to choose between three caskets composed of gold, silver and lead. If they choose the right casket – the casket containing Portia's portrait and a scroll – they win her hand in marriage. If they choose the incorrect casket, they must leave and never seek another woman in marriage. Portia is glad when two suitors, one driven by greed and another by vanity, fail to choose correctly, although she demonstrates tact to the Princes of Morocco and Arragon, who unsuccessfully seek her hand. She favours Bassanio, a young Venetian noble, but is not allowed to give him any clues to assist in his choice.

Later in the play, she disguises herself as a man and then assumes the role of a lawyer's apprentice (named Balthazar) whereby she saves the life of Bassanio's friend Antonio in court.

In the court scene, Portia finds a technicality in the bond, thereby outwitting the Jewish moneylender Shylock and saving Antonio's life from the pound of flesh demanded when everyone else including the Duke presiding as judge and Antonio himself fails. It is Portia who delivers one of the most famous speeches in The Merchant of Venice:

Despite Portia's lack of formal legal training, she wins her case by referring to the details of the exact language of the law. Her success involves prevailing on technicalities rather than the merits of the situation. She uses the tactics of what is sometimes called a Philadelphia lawyer in modern times and in so doing demonstrates that she is far from powerless, irrespective of her earlier lack of choice in the marriage.  However, the concept of rhetoric and its abuse is also brought to light by Portia – highlighting the idea that an unjust argument may win through eloquence, loopholes and technicalities, regardless of the moral question at hand – and thus provoking the audience to consider that issue. Shylock leaves the trial with both his life and his job intact but retains only half of his money and is deprived of his identity on being forced to convert to Christianity, while his daughter Jessica and her Christian husband Lorenzo with whom she had previously eloped are found in Portia's castle, not, it is implied, in complete happiness.  Portia and Bassanio, on the other hand, continue to live together along with the former's lady-in-waiting Nerissa and her husband Gratiano.

Progenitor 

The original Portia Shakespeare drew from was Porcia Catonis, the wife of the Roman statesman Brutus, as well as several biblical allusions. She was also compared to the wife of Brutus within the play in Act 1 scene 1 when Bassanio talks to Antonio.

Portrayals 
The strength of the role of Portia has made it attractive to many notable actresses. Frances Abington, Sarah Siddons and Elizabeth Whitlock all played Portia in the 18th century when actresses first started appearing on stage in performances of the play. More recently, the role has been depicted in the cinema, on television, and in theatres by a number of notable actresses such as Maggie Smith, Claire Bloom, Sybil Thorndike, Joan Plowright, Caroline John, Lynn Collins, Lily Rabe, and Gemma Jones.

Cultural references 
The character of Portia has had a considerable and long-lived cultural impact.
 Abigail Adams adopted the pen name "Portia" in letters to her husband, John Adams, the second president of the United States. John signed his letters with "Lysander".
 The New England School of Law was originally known as the Portia Law School when it was established in 1908 as a women-only law school, and was known by that name until 1969.
 In his Rumpole novels (filmed for the ITV series), author John Mortimer has Rumpole call Phyllida Erskine-Brown (née Trant) the "Portia of our Chambers".
 Georgina Weldon the celebrated Victorian litigant and amateur soprano was referred to as the "Portia of the Law Courts".
 Portia is a moon of Uranus, one of several such named after Shakespearean characters.
Portia de Rossi (born Amanda Lee Rogers), married to Ellen DeGeneres, adopted the name Portia to reinvent herself after becoming a model and actress.
 The Portia Hypothesis, which states women with masculine-sounding names tend to be more successful in a legal profession than otherwise identical counterparts, is named after the character.

Notes and references

Sources 

The Merchant of Venice
Literary characters introduced in 1590
Female Shakespearean characters
Fictional Italian people in literature